Ballplay is an unincorporated community in Monroe County, Tennessee, in the United States.

History
A post office was established as Ball Play in 1830, and remained in operation until it was discontinued in 1910.

References

Unincorporated communities in Monroe County, Tennessee
Unincorporated communities in Tennessee